Galatasaray S.K. Superleague Formula team is the Superleague Formula racing team of Galatasaray SK, a multisports club, famous for its football section that competes in Turkey in the Süper Lig. The team competes in the Superleague Formula. It was operated in 2008 by Scuderia Playteam but in 2009 Ultimate Motorsport will run the team.
Galatasaray belongs to French Barazi-Epsilon race team in 2010 season and the race driver will be Tristan Gommendy from France.

2008 season

In the 2008 Superleague Formula season Galatasaray finished a respectable 8th place in the standings. Alessandro Pier Guidi drove the car in all rounds. The best finish for Galatasaray was 3rd which they posted 3 times.

2009 season

For the 2009 Superleague Formula season Duncan Tappy has been announced the driver.

Record
(key)

2008

2009
Super Final results in 2009 did not count for points towards the main championship.

2010

Gallery

References

External links
 Galatasaray S.K. Superleague Formula team minisite
 Official Galatasaray S.K. football club website

Galatasaray S.K.
Superleague Formula club teams
2008 establishments in Turkey
Turkish auto racing teams
Articles containing video clips